Brigadier General Thomas Walter Brand, 3rd Viscount Hampden  (29 January 1869 – 4 September 1958) was a British peer and soldier, the son of the 2nd Viscount Hampden.

Education
He was educated at Eton College and Trinity College, Cambridge.

Marriage and family
On 29 April 1899, he married Lady Katharine Mary Montagu-Douglas-Scott (a daughter of the 6th Duke of Buccleuch), and they had eight children.

Military career
Brand served as an officer in the Hertfordshire Regiment, and for 10th Royal Hussars during the Second Boer War in South Africa in 1899. Then was private secretary to Earl Cawdor in 1905; then a brigadier-major in the British Armed Forces from 1908 to 1910. Later he served as commanding officer of the 1st Battalion from February 1913. Following the outbreak of the First World War, the Hertfordshires were deployed to the Western Front and Brand remained in command until January 1915. Subsequently, he was promoted to brigadier general and appointed to command the 126th (East Lancashire) Brigade at Gallipoli, the 6th Mounted Brigade with the Western Frontier Force and later the 185th (2/1st West Riding) Brigade at the Battle of Cambrai and the battles of 1918. Between 1935 and 1939, he was Colonel of the 10th Royal Hussars.

Other interests
In 1899, he played in the first international polo match between England and Australia in Melbourne alongside George Bellew-Bryan, 4th Baron Bellew.

References

Work cited

 

 

 

1869 births
1958 deaths
People educated at Eton College
Alumni of Trinity College, Cambridge
25
British Army brigadiers
Companions of the Order of St Michael and St George
Knights Commander of the Order of the Bath
Knights Grand Cross of the Royal Victorian Order
Lord-Lieutenants of Hertfordshire
English justices of the peace
3
British Army personnel of the Second Boer War
Hertfordshire Regiment officers
English polo players
British Army generals of World War I
Presidents of the Marylebone Cricket Club